Malaweg (Malaueg) is spoken by the Malaweg people in the northern part of the Philippines. As per Ethnologue, it is a dialect of the Itawis language.

Malaweg is mostly spoken in the Northern Cordillera Mountain Range region and some in the Province of Cagayan, with the majority in the town of Rizal. Ninety-eight percent of the people living in Rizal are Malaweg-speaking, and the town is known as "The Premier Town of the Malaweg".

Origin
From Fr. Jose Bugarin's Ibanag Dictionary "Ueg [modern: uweg], river estuary. Pl. ueueg [uweweg] = Malaueg: a town in this province, in the district of Itaves (Itawis, now Chico River)"

References

External links
Malaweg lexicon
Malaweg syntax
Ortograpiya Ya Malawég (2016) by Komisyon ng Wikang Filipino (KWF)

Languages of Cagayan
Languages of Apayao
Cagayan Valley languages